Prakash Mehta (born 22 April 1959) is an Indian politician from Maharashtra and a senior leader of the Bharatiya Janata Party (BJP). He was the President for Mumbai BJP Unit.

Prakash Mehta was the State Cabinet Minister for Housing Department. He served six consecutive terms (1990-2019) as the Member of the Legislative Assembly of Maharashtra.

Early life and education
Prakash Mehta belongs to Gujarati middle-class family and is originally from Una town in Saurashtra region of Gujarat. He is married to Kishori Mehta and has 2 sons Abhishek Mehta & Harsh Mehta. Prakash Mehta is the face of Gujarati community and is the most popular Gujarati leader in Maharashtra.  Prakash Mehta was drawn to politics in his early teens and was a member of Rashtriya Swayamsewak Sangh (RSS). During 1975-77, as a youth, he actively participated and volunteered during the Emergency and Total Revolution launched by Jayprakash Narayan.

Political career
He was the President for Mumbai BJP Unit (2013).

Prakash Mehta was the State Cabinet Minister for Housing Department. He was a member of Maharastra Legislative Assembly for six consecutive term from 1990 to 2019.

Mahul residents have been protesting since 23 October 2018 to demand solutions and action from Mehta to relocate them, which has been declared 'not fit for human habitation' by the National Green Tribunal act in 2015.

He was succeeded by Parag Shah in Ghatkopar East constituency in 2019.

See also 
 Manohar Joshi ministry (1995–99)
 Devendra Fadnavis ministry (2014–)
 Make in Maharashtra

References

External links
 Official website (personal) 
  Official profile on Bharatiya Janata Party - Maharashtra website

Bharatiya Janata Party politicians from Maharashtra
Living people
Maharashtra MLAs 2009–2014
Politicians from Mumbai
1959 births
Maharashtra MLAs 2014–2019
State cabinet ministers of Maharashtra
Maharashtra MLAs 1990–1995
Maharashtra MLAs 1995–1999
Maharashtra MLAs 1999–2004
Maharashtra MLAs 2004–2009